Italee Lucas (born January 12, 1989) is an American-Angolan professional basketball player.

Born in the United States, in 2015 Lucas was granted Angolan nationality and became eligible to play for the Angolan Women's Basketball Team

High school
Lucas won a state championship with Centennial High School in 2006 and 2007.

Lucas won the 2007 Powerade Jam fest high school 3 point shootout.

USA Basketball 
Lucas was a member of the USA team which competed in the U18 championship in Colorado Springs, Colorado in June 2006. The team won all four games, earning the gold-medal and a qualification for the 2007 U19 world championship. She continued with the team the following year when the team competed in the U19 championship in Bratislava, Slovakia in August 2007. She averaged 4.9 points per game and recorded 23 assists second highest on the team is the USA team won all nine games and the gold-medal.

College
Lucas finished her final season at University of North Carolina at Chapel Hill averaging 16.2 points, 3.1 rebounds, and 2.6 assists per game in the 2010–11 season.

North  Carolina statistics

Source

Awards
USA U18 National Team -06
Gold Medal Tournament of the Americas U18 -06
USA U19 National Team -07
Gold Medal U19 World Championship - 07
ACC Regular Season Champion -08
ACC Tournament Winner -08
ACC Tournament Semifinals -09
ACC All-Tournament 2nd Team -09
All-ACC 2nd Team -10, 11
ACC All-Tournament 1st Team -11
ACC Tournament Finalist -11
NCAA Sweet 16 -11
Afrobasket.com All-African Champions Cup MVP -13
Afrobasket.com All-African Champions Cup Best Guard -13
Afrobasket.com All-African Champions Cup 1st Team -13
African Champions Cup Winner -13 
African SuperCup Champion - 13
African Championship Champion - 13
Selected as a 2007 McDonald's and WBCA All-American.
Tabbed as a 2007 Gatorade State Player of the Year.
Honored as a 2007 Parade Magazine and EA Sports All-America first team member and a USA Today All-USA second team member.
Named a Parade Magazine All-America second team member in 2006.
Tabbed as a Street & Smith's All-America sixth team member in 2006.
Highlighted as the Las Vegas Review-Journal Nevada Player of the Year in 2006 and 2007.
Honored as the state MVP in 2004-2007 and as the district MVP in 2005 and 2006.
An all-region selection in 2004, 2005 and 2006
All-conference selection in 2004, 2005, 2006 and 2007.

References

External links
North Carolina Tar Heels bio

1989 births
Living people
Sportspeople from Las Vegas
Angolan women's basketball players
American women's basketball players
American emigrants to Angola
Angolan people of African-American descent
American expatriate basketball people in Angola
American expatriate basketball people in Hungary
American expatriate basketball people in Israel
American expatriate basketball people in Romania
American expatriate basketball people in Spain
Angolan expatriate sportspeople in Romania
Basketball players from Nevada
G.D. Interclube women's basketball players
McDonald's High School All-Americans
North Carolina Tar Heels women's basketball players
Parade High School All-Americans (girls' basketball)
Shooting guards
Tulsa Shock draft picks